Elaphe schrenckii is a species of nonvenomous snake in the family Colubridae. The species is indigenous to Northeast Asia.

Common names
Common names for E. schrenckii include Amur rat snake, Manchurian black racer, Manchurian black water snake, Russian rat snake, Schrenck's rat snake, and Siberian rat snake.

Taxonomy
E. schrenckii is very similar to the Korean rat snake, E. anomala, which was once thought to be a subspecies of E. schrenckii and was classified as E. schrenckii anomala.

Etymology
The specific name, schrenckii, is in honor of zoologist Leopold von Schrenck.

Conservation
The species E. schrenckii has not been assessed by the IUCN but is on the China Species Red List with a classification of "Vulnerable VU A2a". It is an officially protected species in Russia and South Korea.

Geographic range

Endemic to Northeast Asia, E. schrenckii is found in  China, Korea, Mongolia, and Russia. It occurs in Russia and China, to the east to Chabarowsk in the Amur region, west to the Chingan mountains, and north to Manchuria (Northeastern China). The common name, Russian rat snake, is misleading as only a small portion of the geographic range of E. schrenckii is in Russia. It has been reported from Chinese provinces of Jilin, Heilongjian, and the Quingyuan area of Liaoning. (Ji Daming e.a., 1985).

In the Netherlands the species occurs as an introduced exotic around Groningen airport near Eelde, where it was first seen in the mid nineteen nineties. Reportedly, pet snakes were released into the wild by someone who did not expect that they would survive the winter. However, the snakes which were hardier than expected bred, and the species is now gradually increasing its range.

Habitat

As one common name, Manchurian black water snake, suggests, this species inhabits fairly moist biotopes such as forest clearings, scrub, farmland, hiding amongst cavities in trees, piles of stone or wood, and when threatened can flee up a tree or into the water. This species occurs up to  altitude and can live in cooler areas than many other snakes.

Description
It is among the largest and most robust of all the rat snake species. It varies greatly in colouration, from creme saddles to dark brown saddles. Many captive bred specimens have been line bred to produce clean yellow saddles. The northern, darker, is the most common variety. This species has 200-236 ventral scales,  55-78 subcaudal scales, and 21-23 rows of dorsal scales.

Behavior

E. schrenckii feeds primarily on small mammals, birds, and bird eggs. It is often found in wetlands, but also found in a wide variety of mainly moist environments such as scrub land, farmland, river banks, swamp land, gardens, stones, log piles, forests, and up in trees.  The Manchurian black water snake is an excellent swimmer (hence one common name) and is a very good climber, as it is semi-arboreal. This snake is believed to be mostly crepuscular (active only at dawn and dusk).

Reproduction
Adult females of E. schrenckii lay from 6 to 30 eggs in June or July. They may retain their eggs for a time, as they may deposit them in a well-advanced state. Eggs usually hatch within 40 days.

References

Further reading
Boulenger GA (1894). Catalogue of the Snakes in the British Museum (Natural History). Volume II., Containing the Conclusion of the Colubridæ Aglyphæ. London: Trustees of the British Museum (Natural History). (Taylor and Francis, printers). xi + 382 pp. + Plates I-XX. (Coluber schrenckii, pp. 48–49).
Strauch A (1873). "Die Schlangen des russischen Reichs, in systematischer und zoogeographischer Beziehung ". Mémoires de l'Académie Impériale des Sciences de St.-Pétersbourg, Series 7, 21 (4): 1-288. (Elaphis schrenckii, new species, pp. 100–103). (in German and Latin).

External links
Mongolian Red List of Reptiles and Amphibians. Zoological Society of London, Regent’s Park, London, NW1 4RY, 2006
 Ratsnake Foundation - E. schrencki,2012
 Photo

Snakes of Asia
Elaphe
Reptiles of China
Reptiles of Korea
Reptiles of Mongolia
Reptiles of Russia
Fauna of Siberia
Taxa named by Alexander Strauch
Reptiles described in 1873